Château de Pez is a vineyard located across the road from Château Calon-Ségur, in the northern parts of Saint Estèphe. Traditionally one of the leading Bourgeois Supérieur wines of the Médoc, it is believed by some to deserve higher classification. In a 2003 Cru Bourgeois classification revision, it was listed as one of 9 Cru Bourgeois Exceptionnels. It has a reputation of consistently producing wine that is both inexpensive and good.

History
In the 17th century, the château was owned by the Pontac family who also owned Château Haut-Brion. The wine was sold under the Pontac label in London before any other Médoc wine. Today the château is owned by the champagne house Louis Roederer since 1995.

References

Bordeaux wine producers